Clonaslee–St Manman's GAA is a Gaelic Athletic Association hurling and Gaelic football  club in Clonaslee, County Laois, Ireland.

The club colours are green and white for football and red and white for hurling.

History
Clonaslee GAA club catered for football and hurling until 1974 when St Manman's Gaelic Football Club was founded and catered exclusively for football. St Manman's reached the 1977 Laois Junior Football Championships final, losing to Portlaoise.

Clonaslee Hurling Club and St Manman's Football Club amalgamated in 2001.

In 1999 Clonaslee–St Manman's joined with Rosenallis to form a joint senior hurling, minor and underage hurling and football teams. This club was called Tinnahinch after the old barony name Tinnahinch which included the parishes of Kilmanman, Reary and Rosenallis. Tinnahinch was in 3 Senior Hurling County Hurling finals, 2002, 2003, 2006. In 2009, it won Division 3 Féile na nGael (Under 14 Hurling) national hurling title.

Achievements

Hurling
 Laois Senior Hurling Championship: (4) 1890, 1891, 1910, and 1975 Beaten finalists in 1908, 1909, 1911, 1970, 1974 and 1976.
 North Laois Senior Hurling Championship (1) 1974
 Laois Intermediate Hurling Championship 1936, 1943, 1955, 1962, 1969, 1982, 1987, 1997
 Laois Junior Hurling Championship: in 1933, 1968, 1978, 1985(B), 2002(B)
 Laois Under-21 B Hurling Championship (1) 1993
 Laois Minor Hurling Championship Finalists 1975

Football
Clonaslee–St Manman's or St Manman's have won the following football county titles; 
 Laois Intermediate Football Championship: (6) 1981, 1998, 2002, 2009, 2015, 2020
 Laois Junior Football Championships: 1978, 1997
 Laois Junior C Football Championship: 2007
 Laois Under 21 B Football Championship: 1999, 2006, 2007,2009 (last three as Tinnahinch)
 Laois All-County Football League Div. 2: 1981, 1987, 1990, 2002, 2019
 Laois All-County Football League Div. 3:  1998
 Laois All-County Football League Div. 5:'''  2016

Notable players
Darren Rooney, a former club member, represented Laois at senior hurling and football level. His brothers Mark and Declan also played hurling and football for their county, while James Young is also a former Laois senior hurler.

References

Gaelic games clubs in County Laois
Gaelic football clubs in County Laois
Hurling clubs in County Laois